Thank God is a 2022 Indian Hindi-language fantasy comedy drama film directed by Indra Kumar. It is an official remake of the 2009 Danish film  Sorte kugler (What Goes Around, 2009). It stars Ajay Devgn, Sidharth Malhotra and Rakul Preet Singh.

Thank God was released theatrically on 25 October 2022 during Diwali festivities. It received mixed reviews from critics and was a commercial failure.

Plot 
Ayaan Kapoor is a real estate businessman who is in debt of 16 crores. He had a growing real estate business, but fell into debt due to his involvement in black money and subsequent demonetisation. He wanted to sell his house to repay his debt but could not find any buyer and starts living at his wife's house with his wife - Inspector Ruhi - and daughter Pihu. 

One day, Ayaan gets involved in a road accident, and regains consciousness in Heaven, where the gods Yamaduta and Chitragupta provide him a chance to send him back to Earth by asking him to play a game called Game of Life. There are two containers, one to be filled with white balls, which represent his positives, and the other with black balls, which represent his sins and weaknesses. The initial position for Ayaan is very tough as he starts off with a lot of black balls. Ayaan is shown to be jealous of his wife Ruhi as she's an inspector whereas Ayaan had failed to become an inspector. Chitragupta puts him in a scenario where he's an inspector tasked to save a hostage. However, his failure to do so shows him that the reality is that he couldn't have been a better inspector when compared to Ruhi. Ayaan is shown to be the one who believes in God but he still gets black balls because of his lack of humanity. 

Later on, the game changes when Ayaan finally gets white balls for controlling his anger. His challenges also include apologizing his elder sister for falsely blaming her during their childhood of the burning their father's house. In heaven, Ayaan gets beaten by his father due to which he apologizes to his sister. He wins by earning white balls due to which Chitragupta awards him a check of 18 crores for the sale of house, something that even Ayaan couldn't do. However, Chitragupta sees a tattoo of another woman on Ayaan's elbow, earning him many black balls. Chitragupta shows him reality, where  his wife and relatives were planning to buy him a new car after hearing that his car would be towed due to his bank loan. But the car which collided with Aayan's car was the new car that Ruhi bought for Ayaan. 

He returns to earth where Doctor tells him that Pihu's kidneys are damaged and Ruhi's one kidney is affected. Aayan earns reputation in real estate but was about to lose his family. Ayaan signed a donor form before becoming unconscious again due to overdose of some pills. Later on, he again returns to heaven where Chitragupta and his father are proud of him. Chitragupta blesses Ayaan and his family with a new life. The Doctors give Ayaan news that a man bought his dead relative's body but didn't reveal his name. However, it's revealed that the man was wearing a locket where it was written CG. After being blessed with new life, Ayaan gets his ancestral home repaired and also adopts a child. This time, he's a changed man who now gives more importance to his family.

Cast 
 Ajay Devgn as C. G. (Chitragupta)
 Sidharth Malhotra as Ayaan Kapoor
 Rakul Preet Singh as Ruhi Kapoor
 Kiara Khanna as Pihu Kapoor
 Kiku Sharda as man in lift
 Seema Pahwa as Ayaan's mother
 Kanwaljit Singh as Ayaan's father
 Urmilla Kothare as Ayaan's sister
 Sumit Gulati 
 Mahesh Balraj as YD (Yamdoot)
 Soundarya Sharma as Tanya 
 Nora Fatehi as herself

Production 
The official announcement of the film was made on 7 January 2021. Principal photography began in Mumbai on 21 January, and wrapped on 11 January 2022.

Soundtrack 

The songs are composed by Tanishk Bagchi, Rochak Kohli and Chamath Sangeeth. The lyrics are written by Manoj Muntashir, Rashmi Virag, Sameer, Dulan ARX and Mellow D. The film score is composed by Amar Mohile.

The first song "Manike" has a remake version of "Manike Mage Hithe", sung by the same singer Yohani.

Reception 
Thank God received mixed reviews from critics.

Bollywood Hungama rated the film 3.5 out of 5 stars and wrote "Thank God is a film that entertains and enlightens, a perfect family entertainer this Diwali". Ganesh Aaglave of Firstpost rated the film 3.5 out of 5 stars and wrote "Director Indra Kumar perfectly blends comedy and drama to give us a Diwali entertainer with Ajay Devgn, Sidharth Malhotra and Rakul Preet Singh starrer Thank God". Dhaval Roy of The Times of India rated the film 3 out of 5 stars and wrote "The film has a message or two about moving on about tribulations, being humane and the importance of one's family". Devesh Sharma of Filmfare rated the film 3 out of 5 stars and wrote "Watch Thank God for its light-hearted moments". Rohit Bhatnagar of The Free Press Journal rated the film 3 out of 5 stars and wrote "Thank God is a so-called family entertainer that is stuck in the '90s. Watch it if you are okay to expect a sob tale rather than a pure comedy". Sonil Dedhia of News 18 rated the film 3 out of 5 stars and wrote "Thank God is an entertainer with its share of funny moments". Pratikshya Mishra of The Quint rated the film 2.5 out of 5 stars and wrote "The film goes from comedy to grief to introspection rapidly. While all these emotions are deployed well individually, as a whole, the film suffers from this constant tonal shift". Tushar Joshi of India Today rated the film 2 out of 5 stars and wrote "Despite Ajay's star power and Siddharth's charm, the film fails to hold the viewers' interest".

References

External links 
 
 Thank God at Bollywood Hungama

 
2022 films
2020s Hindi-language films
Indian fantasy comedy films
T-Series (company) films
Films directed by Indra Kumar
Indian remakes of foreign films